Özgür Varlık (born 6 February 1979) 
is a Turkish sport shooter competing in the 25 meter rapid fire pistol events. Verlik obtained a quota for participation at the 2020 Summer Olympics after the 2019 European Games held in Minsk, Belarus.

References

1979 births
Living people
Sportspeople from Ankara
Turkish male sport shooters
European Games competitors for Turkey
Shooters at the 2019 European Games
Shooters at the 2020 Summer Olympics
Olympic shooters of Turkey
21st-century Turkish people